Dr. A.P.J. Abdul Kalam Centre is a non-profit organization located primarily in India with branches spread across the country. It was formed in the memory of Dr. A.P.J. Abdul Kalam (11th President of India) in 2015. The organization is founded by Srijan Pal Singh, an author, social entrepreneur, and public speaker. He also worked as the Officer-on-Special-Duty and Advisor for Science, Technology, and Policy to Dr. A.P.J. Abdul Kalam between 2009 and 2015. The organization aspires to create a sustainable and livable planet Earth for humanity by taking forward the vision of Dr. Kalam. It also aims to promote innovations, especially in governance and social enterprises, to improve youth participation in national and international development so as to improve access to education as well as knowledge in all strata of society.

Pillars

Education 
Kalam Centre runs a network of free libraries across remote and economically backward regions of India under the banner of Kalam Library. These libraries cater to the reading and learning needs of children in slums, government schools, low-cost private schools, and children observation homes. Collectively, the libraries serve the needs of over 500,000 children. Another initiative is that of Dreamathon which is an annual flagship campaign to ignite the passion for learning among the youth. It supports them by providing relevant skills to help them reach their full potential and go beyond. Kalam Centre also has over 500 auxiliary teachers in Telangana under the initiative of Kalam Bharat to help fill the knowledge gaps in government schools.

Governance 
Kalam Centre annually organizes the India Innovation and Governance Summit where selected deserving individuals and institutions are awarded for their work towards improving governance and delivering value to the citizens. The summit also acts as a forum for plenary discussions. Since 2017, three editions of the summit have been conducted, with the latest being organized on 28 February 2019 where M. Venkaiah Naidu (Vice President of India) was the Chief Guest. Some of the KIGA awardees until now include K. Srinivas (IAS, Additional Secretary, DoPT), Nara Lokesh (Cabinet Minister, Information Technology, Panchayati Raj and Rural Development, Government of Andhra Pradesh), Ashwani Lohani (Chairman, Indian Railway Board, and former MD, Air India), Dr. Mahesh Gupta (Chairman and MD, Kent RO Systems), Anuj Dayal (Executive Director, DMRC), Dnyaneshwar Mulay (Secretary MEA, CPV & OIA), Shivraj Singh Chouhan (Former Chief Minister), Lieutenant General Amarjeet Singh Bedi (DGDIA & DCIDS – Intelligence, Ministry of Defence, Government of India), Chennai Metro Rail Limited, among many others.

Innovation and Technology 
Kalam Centre works in collaboration with universities and organizations in campaigning research and innovation-led projects to propel growth and development, especially for those at the base of the pyramid. Through its skill development initiatives and startup 'Parikramas' under Kalam Centre for Innovation & Incubation of Startups (K-CIIS), it aims to foster the entrepreneurial mindset and action-oriented thinking among the youth.

Environment 
Every year, on the death anniversary of Dr. Kalam, Kalam Centre organizes an Intentional Youth Conclave on the topic of the last lecture of Dr. Kalam - Creating a Livable Planet Earth, which he was supposed to give at IIM-Shillong.

References 

2015 establishments in India
Non-profit organisations based in India
Literacy in India
Educational organisations based in India
Organisations based in India
Organizations established in 2015
Foundations based in India
Child education organizations